Arani taluk is a taluk of Tiruvannamalai district of the Indian state of Tamil Nadu. The headquarters is the town of Arani.

Demographics
According to the 2011 census, the taluk of Arani had a population of 294,207 with 146,850 males and 147,357 females. There were 1,003 women for every 1,000 men. The taluk had a literacy rate of 71.68. Child population in the age group below 6 was 14,866 males and 14,186 females.

See also
Arani Municipality

References

Etymology
Hypothesis #1
In olden days Arani was called Aranyam. Aar means Athi tree; such trees once covered the region. In the north of Arani, there was a river, the Kamandala Naga river. These trees and river looked like an ornament; hence the name Arani.

Hypothesis #2
The river Kamandala Naga Nathi flows in one side and the Tatchur river flows in other side as ornament (In Tamil literature ornament means "Ani") so Aaru(River) is making Ani(Ornament) hence the name Arani.

Hypothesis #3
In Sanskrit Aranyam means 'Forest'. Hence, Derived from Aranyam.

History
Arani was ruled by the Cholas after they defeated the Pallavas. Some of the important Chola kings who ruled out Arani are Kulothunga Cholan I, Vikrama Cholan, and Kulothunga Cholan II.

During the rule of the Vijayanagara Kingdom in Arani, the Dasara function was celebrated grandly. In 1640 jagir of Arani was granted to Vedaji Bhaskar Pant a Marathi brahmin. The jagir continued to be headed by the descendants of Bhaskar Pant till the Zamindari Abolition Bill was passed in 1948.

Poosi Malai Kuppam is 12 kilometres (7 mi) away from Arani. Thirumalai Saheb built a sophisticated bungalow for his lover, an Anglo-Indian lady, there. During the Nawab period, there was a struggle between the British, French and Nawab Hyder Ali. The victorious British captured Arani. There is also a palace near the town, now used by the Agriculture Department.

The town was used by Arcot nawabs for their military training campus. The famous 18th-century Marathi poet, author of the very beautiful poem "Nal-Damayanti Swayamvarakhyana" (the story of swayamvara of Nal & Damayanti) Raghunath Pandit is believed to have lived here.

The tomb situated in the heart of city for Sir. Ensign Robert Kelly who was a surveying Arani area, a colonel by then, died in September 1790.

Arani and the Congress Movement
The Congress movement in Arani was started by M. V. Subramania Sasthriar, S.A. Allala sundaram Mudaliyar, Y. N. Govindaraju Chettiar, Dr V Hariharan and others. Mahatma Gandhi visited Arani twice, once in 1932 and the second time in 1934. During his second visit he was accompanied by Dr Rajendra Prasad. Gandhiji's visits aimed at boosting Harijan upliftment and the movement for the boycott of Simon Commission, Gandhiji visited Dr V Hariharan, an eminent physician and freedom fighter of Arani at his residence and held extensive consultations with him, as the latter was already actively involved in the upliftment of the impoverished weaver community of Arani.

Fort
There is a fort in the heart of the town which is surrounded by agazhi called in Tamil. Fort area houses forest department, sub jail, registration office, police station, women police station, agricultural office, there is a parade ground within the fort area. Parade ground has a monument at the center in the memory of late Col. Robert Kelly. Govt. Boys High School, Govt. Girls High School and Subramaniya Sastri High School are located within the fort area. Kailayanathar temple and Vembuli amman temple are very famous

Industry and commerce
Arani is well known for its rice paddies; Arani has the highest number of rice mills in the north district of Tamil Nadu; there are around 278 modern rice mills in the town. The town supplies rice to various towns in Tamil Nadu, various states and even various countries.

Silk weaving in Arani, Thiruvannamalai district, Tamil Nadu
The town also has a large community of silk weavers, called MUDALIYARS and Pattū nool karar, who specialize in making silk sarees. Hand looms are most frequently used for the weaving, although recently some have turned to mechanized methods such as Power looms. Arani is the number one in revenue earning in Tiruvannamalai District, Tamil Nadu. Though the town is not well known outside Tamil Nadu, a bulk of India's silk apparels is produced by the people of Arani. The Arani gold is also very valuable in gold market.

Events
The Vembuli Amman (வேம்புலி அம்மன்) Festival is a grand carnival in the town of Arani. It takes place once in a year in the month of August. Nearly one lakh people gather at the temple on this festive occasion.
Shri Puthra Kamateeswara Thirukoil witnesses a massive crowd during Kaanum Pongal (காணும் பொங்கல்)
The Sri LakshmiNarasingaperumal Festival is grand carnival in the town of Nadaga salaipettai st, Saidai, ARANI
The Sundhara Vinayagar Thirukovil resides, Arnipalayam  in Arani. For every Ganesh Chadhurthi, the village peoples will organized a three days grand function including Annadhanam, orchestra etc... The people who migrate from this place will come with their friends and relatives and gather at this places for this auspicious function.
The Muthu Mariyamman thirukovil which is newly reconstructed on 2010 in Velappadi.. There is a grand festival is celebrated in velappadi village on every April month. More than thousands of peoples will gather on that day. All the families will engage with their friends, relatives and will have more enjoyment on this special occasion.
The Venkatesan Patti (around 10 km from Arani) is famous for the Baba, Hanuman and Mariamman temple. Every Thursday people gather here for Baba Arthi. The Hanuman Temple and Baba Temple was constructed by R. Subramanian Advocate in the year 2010 and 2011 respectively. The Baba here resembles Shiridi Baba. The children from the nearby schools too will participate in the Arthi. After demise of R. Subramanian, a memorial was established in Venkatesan Patti as a dedication to him by his families and friends.
The famous Mysore Maharaja Maligai(Jagiri Maligai) at S.V. Nagaram is located 5 km from the Arani Town.
The famous Valapandal Pachaiamman Koil Temple which is 10 km from the Arani Town and 8 km from the Paiyyur tank and Ramakrishna pettai (The Eastern part of Arani).
The famous Muthu Mariyamman thirukovil (around 12 km) at Kasthambadi Village. Every year seven days festival on every Tuesdays in a grand manner from July to August (i.e. in Tamil month Aadi).
The famous padaivedumariyamman koil in is also near to arani

Politics
Arani is one of the 234 MLA constituency in Tamil Nadu, Arani is a Lok Sabha (Parliament of India) constituency in Tamil Nadu. It was created during the 2008 assembly delimitation from the former Vandavasi constituency Arani (Lok Sabha constituency). Arani assembly constituency was once a part of the Vellore (Lok Sabha constituency).

Tourism
Arahanthgiri Jain Math[edit]
Main article: Arahanthgiri Jain Math
Arahanthgiri Jain Math is a Jain Math that was established at the ancient Jain site of Tiruvannaamalai in August, 1998.[5] The complex includes 3 Jain caves, 4 Jain temples and a 16 meter high sculpture of Neminatha thought to date from the 12th century that is the tallest Jain image in Tamil Nadu.

Education
Anna University College of Engineering Arani[edit]
Main article: Anna University § Anna University - Constituent & University Colleges
Anna University has its University College of Engineering Arani in Arani, S.S.Hr.Sec.School Arani has completed 100 years.

Taluks of Tiruvannamalai district